The Rick Aqua Jays Water Ski Show Team is an amateur water ski club in Janesville, Wisconsin. The club participates in show skiing, which involves water ski acts that are choreographed to music and built around a theme that tells a story. The Rick Aqua Jays has about 150 members.

History 
The Rock Aqua Jays ski club was formed in 1960. That same year it was one of four founding member groups of the Wisconsin Water Ski Federation. In 1961, the club assumed the name "Rock Aqua Jays". The club practices on the Rock River at Traxler Park in Janesville, where they hold twice weekly shows between Memorial Day and Labor Day. The Rock Aqua Jays initiated the first national tournament of the National Show Ski Association, the Show Ski National Championships, which were held in August, 1975. They have hosted the national tournament in Janesville 26 of the 39 times it has been held. In 2012 they hosted the first ever World Water Ski Show Tournament.

The club was the first amateur team to build the three-high pyramid (1974), the four-high pyramid (1981), and the five-high pyramid (1993). They hold the record for the largest pyramid in competition: 44 people (2003). They were the first amateur American ski team to perform in the People's Republic of China, in 1999. In 2012, in collaboration with the Chinese Water Ski Team, the Aqua Jays set a Guinness World Record for the number of humans to water ski in a pyramid: 55. They have won the national show ski tournament a record 19 times, and placed second in the event 12 times. The Aqua Jays have also won the Wisconsin State Show Tournament a record 15 times. They have taken the triple crown of show skiing 11 times, and were named the National Show Ski Association Team of the Year 6 times.

Honors and awards
Sources:

2014
 Triple Crown:
 1st - U.S. National Show Tournament
 1st - Wisconsin State Show Tournament
 1st - Mercury Invitational Show Tournament

2013
 Triple Crown:
 1st - U.S. National Show Tournament
 1st - Wisconsin State Show Tournament
 1st - Mercury Invitational Show Tournament

2012
 National Show Ski Association Team of the Year
 1st - U.S. National Show Tournament
 2nd - Wisconsin State Show Tournament
 1st - Mercury Invitational Show Tournament

2011
 National Show Ski Association Team of the Year
 Triple Crown:
 1st - U.S. National Show Tournament
 1st - Wisconsin State Show Tournament
 1st - Mercury Invitational Show Tournament

2010
 2nd - U.S. National Show Tournament
 1st - Wisconsin State Show Tournament
 1st - Mercury Invitational Show Tournament

2009
 2nd - Wisconsin State Show Tournament
 1st - Mercury Invitational Show Tournament

2008
 2nd - U.S. National Show Tournament

2007
 1st - Mercury Invitational Show Tournament

2006
 2nd - U.S. National Show Tournament
 2nd - Wisconsin State Show Tournament
 1st - Mercury Invitational Show Tournament

2005
 National Show Ski Association Team of the Year
 Triple Crown:
 1st - U.S. National Show Tournament
 1st - Wisconsin State Show Tournament
 1st - Mercury Invitational Show Tournament

2004
 2nd - U.S. National Show Tournament
 2nd - Wisconsin State Show Tournament

2003
 National Show Ski Association Team of the Year
 Triple Crown:
 1st - U.S. National Show Tournament
 1st - Wisconsin State Show Tournament
 1st - Mercury Invitational Show Tournament

2002
 National Show Ski Association Team of the Year
 1st - U.S. National Show Tournament
 1st - Wisconsin State Show Tournament
 2nd - Mercury Invitational Show Tournament

2001
 2nd - Wisconsin State Show Tournament
 1st - Mercury Invitational Show Tournament

2000
 2nd - Wisconsin State Show Tournament

1999
 National Show Ski Association Team of the Year
 1st - U.S. National Show Tournament
 1st - Wisconsin State Show Tournament
 2nd - Lamb's Farm Invitational Tournament
 1st - Mercury Invitational Show Tournament

1998
 1st - Wisconsin State Show Tournament
 1st - Lamb's Farm Invitational Tournament
 1st - Mercury Invitational Show Tournament

1997
 1st - U.S. National Show Tournament
 1st - Mercury Invitational Show Tournament

1996
 2nd - U.S. National Show Tournament
 1st - Wisconsin State Show Tournament
 1st - Mercury Invitational Show Tournament

1995
 1st - U.S. National Show Tournament
 1st - Lamb's Farm Invitational Tournament

1994
 2nd - U.S. National Show Tournament
 1st - Lamb's Farm Invitational Tournament

1993
 Triple Crown:
 1st - U.S. National Show Tournament
1st - Wisconsin State Show Tournament
1st - Lamb's Farm Invitational Tournament

1992
 2nd - U.S. National Show Tournament

1991
 2nd - U.S. National Show Tournament

1990
 1st - U.S. National Show Tournament
 1st - Lamb's Farm Invitational Tournament

1989
 1st - U.S. National Show Tournament
 1st - Lamb's Farm Invitational Tournament

1988
 Triple Crown:
 1st - U.S. National Show Tournament
 1st - Wisconsin State Show Tournament
 1st - Lamb's Farm Invitational Tournament

1987
 Triple Crown:
 1st - U.S. National Show Tournament
 1st - Wisconsin State Show Tournament
 1st - Lamb's Farm Invitational Tournament

1986
 1st - U.S. National Show Tournament

1985
 Triple Crown:
 1st - U.S. National Show Tournament
 1st - Wisconsin State Show Tournament
 1st - Lamb's Farm Invitational Tournament

1984
 2nd - U.S. National Show Tournament

1983
 2nd - U.S. National Show Tournament

1982
 2nd - U.S. National Show Tournament

1981
 Triple Crown:
 1st - U.S. National Show Tournament
 1st - Wisconsin State Show Tournament
 1st - Lamb's Farm Invitational Tournament

1980
 1st - Wisconsin State Show Tournament
 2nd - U.S. National Show Tournament

1979
 1st - U.S. National Show Tournament

1977
 2nd - U.S. National Show Tournament

1975
 1st - Lamb's Farm Invitational Tournament

References

External links 
 Rock Aqua Jays website
 The Greatest Show on Skis - WaterSki magazine, July 2003
 It's a Long Way to the Top - WaterSki magazine, June 2001
 USA Waterski
 A Brief History of Show Skiing

Waterskiing
Janesville, Wisconsin
Sports in Wisconsin
1960 establishments in Wisconsin
Sports clubs established in 1960